The Ngulu people, also known as the Geja, Kingulu, Nguru, Nguu, Wayomba, (Swahili collective: Wangulu) are a Bantu ethnolinguistic group hailing from Southern Kilindi District, western Tanga Region of Tanzania and Mvomero District of Morogoro Region. The Ngulu population is around 390,000 people.

References

Ethnic groups in Tanzania